The Aeronautical Information Exchange Model (AIXM) is designed to enable the management and distribution of Aeronautical Information Services (AIS) data in digital format. AIXM is based on Geography Markup Language (GML) and is one of the GML Application Schemas which is applicable for the Aeronautical domain. It was developed by the US Federal Aviation Administration (FAA), the US National Geospatial Intelligence Agency (NGA) and the European Organisation for the Safety of Air Navigation (EUROCONTROL).The current version is AIXM 5.1.1.

Model

AIXM has two main components:
The Aeronautical Information Conceptual Model 
The AIXM XML Schema

The Aeronautical Information Conceptual Model
The Aeronautical Information Conceptual Model (AICM) is a conceptual model of the aeronautical domain. It describes the features and their properties (attributes and associations) within the domain. Therefore, it can be used as the logical basis for Aeronautical Information Management databases and AIXM.

The model is designed using the Unified Modelling Language (UML).

AIXM XML Schema
The AIXM XML Schema is an exchange model for aeronautical data and a concrete implementation of AICM. It is an implementation of the Conceptual Model as an XML schema. Therefore, it can be used to send aeronautical information to others in the form of XML encoded data, enabling systems to exchange aeronautical information.

Purpose 
The aim of AIXM is to allow for the management and distribution of AIS data in a digital format. This includes information such as airport area data, airspace structures, organisations and units, points and navaids, procedures, routes and flying restrictions. Current versions are also designed to be able to manage and distribute the full timeline of aeronautical data, including temporary updates. These features form a key part of the EUROCONTROL backed move from AIS to Aeronautical Information Management (AIM), the transition from using data based on paper documentation and telex messages to using solely digital data.

History 
Development of AIXM was initially started in order to facilitate the development of the European AIS Database (EAD). The development of AICM was started in 1996, with an initial release in 1997, which allowed for the development of the AIXM XML Schema. Initial developments were “SQL-based”, with development moving to XML in 1999. The first version of the schema was released in 1999 as AICM/AIXM 2.1 with further development leading to an updated version, AICM/AIXM 3.3 in 2002. This then allowed the EAD to begin operations in 2003.

After this, EUROCONTROL began a partnership with the FAA and the US National Geospatial Intelligence Agency in order to further develop AIXM for international usage and cover global civilian and military needs. The AIXM Change Control Board (ACCB) was set up to allow for international states and industries to participate in the development of AIXM. In 2004 AIXM 4.0 was released with an update (4.5) in 2005 which was the first version to incorporate suggestions from the ACCB and the international community.

Version 5.0 was developed through a public design review meeting at the 2006 Global AIM Congress. AIXM 5.0 aligned the format with current ISO standards for geospatial information, including GML, allowed for modular development and future extension and was also the first version to enable digital NOTAM. This version is still in use by some “early adopters” including the FAA.

AIXM Viewers 
Whilst AIXM does use GML standards, it cannot be viewed with standard GML viewers as aeronautical data requires specialised processing. EUROCONTROL and the FAA maintain a list of AIXM viewers developed by EUROCONTROL, Luciad and Snowflake Software (now part of Cirium). EUROCONTROL also maintains a list of free sample data that can be used with these viewers.

References

External links
 
 
 Free 3D AIXM Viewer
 Free AIXM 5 2D and 3D viewer

Industry-specific XML-based standards
GIS file formats